David Morris Potter (December 6, 1910 – February 18, 1971) was an American historian specializing in the study of the American South and the American Civil War.

He was born in Augusta, Georgia, graduated from the Academy of Richmond County, and in 1932 graduated from Emory University. Potter entered graduate school at Yale the same year but left four years later without finishing his dissertation. He taught at the University of Mississippi for two years, then at Rice University for another two before completing his dissertation in 1940 under Ulrich Bonnell Phillips.

In 1942 Yale published his dissertation as Lincoln and His Party in the Secession Crisis and hired him as an assistant professor. As professor of history at Yale University in 1942–1961 and Coe Professor of American History at Stanford University in 1961–1971 he directed numerous dissertations and served on numerous editorial and professional boards.  He also held the Walgreen Lectureship at the University of Chicago, and the Commonwealth Fund Lectureship at the University of London.  Potter held the Harold Vyvyan Harmsworth Professor of American History at Oxford University in 1947.  He was a pioneer in sponsoring the study of Women's history.

Potter was an elected member of the American Philosophical Society and the American Academy of Arts and Sciences. He posthumously won the 1977 Pulitzer Prize for History for The Impending Crisis, 1848–1861 (1976), an in-depth narrative and analysis of the causes of the American Civil War.  His main achievement was to put the history of the South in national perspective.  He rejected the conflict model of Charles A. Beard and emphasized the depth of consensus on American values.  He considered himself a conservative and was a prominent exponent of Consensus history.

Potter died of cancer at age 60. The New York Times obituary quoted an encomium of historian Martin Duberman: "David Potter may be the greatest living historian in the United States. To read him is to become aware of a truth that only the greatest historians have been able to show us: That the chief lesson to be derived from a study of the past is that it holds no simple lesson, and that the historian's main responsibility is to prevent anyone from claiming that it does."

Bibliography
 His most important book, completed and edited by Don E. Fehrenbacher, was The Impending Crisis, 1848–1861, Harper & Row, 1976.
 Lincoln and His Party in the Secession Crisis (1942), with a new preface in 1962. New Haven, Connecticut: Yale University Press. Published with a new introduction by Daniel W. Crofts. Baton Rouge, LA: Louisiana State University Press, 1995.
 "American Women and the American Character" in American Character and Culture in a Changing World: Some Twentieth-Century Perspectives (Greenwood Press, 1979): 209–225.
 Freedom and Its Limitations in American Life, edited by Don E. Fehrenbacher, compiled by George Harmon Knoles, Stanford University Press, 1976.
 History and American Society: Essays of David M. Potter, ed. by Don E. Fehrenbacher, Oxford University Press, 1973.
 Division and the Stresses of Reunion, 1845-1876, Glenview, Ill.: Scott, Foresman, 1973.
 The South and the Concurrent Majority, edited by Don E. Fehrenbacher and Carl N. Degler, Baton Rouge, LA: Louisiana State University Press, 1972.
 The South and the Sectional Conflict, Baton Rouge, LA: Louisiana State University Press, 1968.
 (With Curtis R. Grant) Eight Issues in American History: Views and Counterviews, Glenview, Ill.: Scott, Foresman, 1966.
 "The Historian's Use of Nationalism and Vice Versa," American Historical Review, Vol. 67, No. 4 (July 1962), pp. 924–950 in JSTOR
 The Background of the Civil War, National Council for the Social Studies, 1961.
 (With Manning) Nationalism and Sectionalism in America, 1775-1877, Holt, 1961.
 (Editor, with William Goetzmann) The New Deal and Employment, Holt, 1960.
 (Editor) E. David Cronon and Howard R. Lamar, The Railroads, Holt, 1960.
 (Editor) Party Politics and Public Action, 1877-1917, Holt, 1960.
 The American Round Table Discussions on People's Capitalism, 1957.
 People of Plenty: Economic Abundance and the American Character, 1954.
 (With Thomas G. Manning) Select Problems in Historical Interpretation, Holt, Volume I, 1949, Volume II, 1950.
 "An Appraisal of Fifteen Years of the Journal of Southern History, 1935–1949," Journal of Southern History, Vol. 16, No. 1 (Feb. 1950), pp. 25–32 in JSTOR
 Editor of Yale Review, 1949-51.
 "The Historical Development of Eastern-Southern Freight Rate Relationships," Law and Contemporary Problems, Vol. 12, No. 3 (Summer, 1947), pp. 416–448 in JSTOR
 "Horace Greeley and Peaceable Secession," Journal of Southern History, Vol. 7, No. 2 (May 1941), pp. 145–159 in JSTOR
 "Why the Republicans Rejected Both Compromise and Secession," in George Harmon Knoles, ed., The Crisis of the Union: 1860-1861, Baton Rouge, LA: Louisiana State University Press, 1965, pp. 90–106, Comment by Kenneth M. Stampp, pp. 107–113; reprinted in Wilentz, Sean, ed., The Best American History Essays on Lincoln, New York: Palgrave Macmillan, 2009, pp. 175–188, without the comment by Stampp. Potter believed Republicans rejected both compromise and secession because they thought Southern Unionism would prevail. They did not believe that rejecting compromise and secession would lead to war. "Today, our hindsight makes it difficult for us to understand the reliance on Southern Unionism." (Knoles, 101).

Notes

Further reading
 Barney, William L. "Potter's The Impending Crisis: A Capstone and a Challenge." Reviews in American History 1976 4(4): 551–557. JSTOR
 Brogan, Denis. “David M. Potter.” In Pastmasters: Some Essays on American Historians edited by Marcus Cunliffe and Robin W. Winks, (1969) pp. 316–44
 Collins, Robert M. "David Potter's People of Plenty and the Recycling of Consensus History," Reviews in American History 16 (June 1988): 321–335. in JSTOR
 Fredrickson, George M. "Two Southern Historians." American Historical Review 1970 75(5): 1387–1392. in JSTOR. The two Southern historians of the title are Potter and Fletcher Melvin Green.

 Gallagher, Gary W. "A Master's Lessons" Civil War Times (Feb 2020) 59#1, on Potter as teacher.
 Johannsen, Robert W. "David Potter, Historian and Social Critic: a Review Essay."  Civil War History 1974 20(1): 35–44. ISSN 0009-8078
 Temperley, Howard. "David M. Potter", in Robert Allen Rutland, ed., Clio's Favorites: Leading Historians of the United States, 1945–2000, U of Missouri Press (2000), pp. 138–155.
 Thomas Winter. "Potter, David Morris"; American National Biography Online 2000.

External links
 http://biography.yourdictionary.com/david-m-potter
 

1910 births
1971 deaths
Writers from Augusta, Georgia
Historians of the American Civil War
Historians of the United States
Presidents of the American Historical Association
Pulitzer Prize for History winners
Yale University alumni
Yale University faculty
Stanford University Department of History faculty
Academy of Richmond County alumni
20th-century American historians
20th-century American male writers
Historians from Georgia (U.S. state)
American male non-fiction writers
Members of the American Philosophical Society